Chaussy is a commune in the Val-d'Oise department in Île-de-France in northern France.

Geography
Chaussy is located approximately 55 km from the center of Paris.

Gallery

See also
Communes of the Val-d'Oise department

References

External links

Official website 

Association of Mayors of the Val d'Oise 

Communes of Val-d'Oise